Hannah Tompkins (January 17, 1920 – October 25, 1995) was an American artist primarily known for her large body of artwork based on the writings of William Shakespeare. A catalog listing of her Shakespeare themed oil paintings appears in Shakespeare in American Painting : A Catalogue from the Late Eighteenth Century to the Present by Richard .

She began painting in earnest in the mid-1960s while teaching art at Ramapo Community College, Rockland County, New York.  In 1979 she opened the Shambles Gallery in Santa Cruz, California and in 1984 opened the Shakespeare Art Museum in Ashland, Oregon.

Background
Born in the Williamsburg slum in Brooklyn, New York to Russian and Polish Jewish immigrants, third youngest of eight children, Tompkins found her love of Shakespeare as an adolescent while residing in various foster homes after being placed as a baby in the Brooklyn Hebrew Orphan Asylum. In 1937 she graduated Girls Commercial High School in NYC with an Art Diploma. She became active in the progressive movement during the great depression and World War II during which she married artist Irving Fierstein. In 1948 the couple was instrumental in the development of Harmon Park in Croton-on-Hudson, New York.  This was a community of ten families of artists, commercial artists and architects seeking a progressive and creative environment within a suburban lifestyle. It was here that they built a house and raised four children. After divorcing in 1964, Hannah embarked upon her life as an artist living respectively in Sloatsburg, New York; Ft. Lauderdale, Florida; Guadalajara, Mexico; Santa Cruz, California; Ashland, Oregon; and Clearwater, Florida. She continued creating artworks until her death from cancer at the age of 75.

Exhibitions
A partial list of her exhibitions includes:
 1964 - NYU Summer Theater, Tuxedo, New York; Tappan Zee Playhouse, Nyack, New York;  with Selma Gubin at Sloatsburg Inn, Sloatsburg, New York; with group show  Clarksville Galleries, West Nyack, New York; Carnegie Hall, NYC, New York 
 1965 - With group show Clarksville Galleries; one-woman show Sterling Forest, Tuxedo, New York;   group show Rockland Community College, New York; one-woman show Ithaca College Music Bldg, New York; one-woman show Rockland Community College, New York
 1967 - One-woman show Jordan Marsh, Ft. Lauderdale, Florida; one-woman show Parker Playhouse, Ft. Lauderdale, Florida
 1968 - One-woman show Jordan Marsh, West Palm Beach, Florida
 1969 - Las Olas Galleries, Ft. Lauderdale, Florida
 1973 - Exhibits & lectures at the Univ of Texas (Austin); Bowmer Theater in Ashland, Oregon Shakespeare Festival; Newman Hall, Berkeley, California
 1983 - Stevenson College Library, UC, Santa Cruz, California

References

External links
 The Shakespeare Art Museum

1920 births
1995 deaths
People from Williamsburg, Brooklyn
American women painters
Deaths from cancer in Florida
20th-century American Jews
Ramapo College faculty
Artists from New York City
People from Croton-on-Hudson, New York
People from Sloatsburg, New York
20th-century American women artists
American women printmakers
20th-century American printmakers
American women academics